is a Shinto shrine located on Mount Ryōzen in the former town of Ryozen, within the city of Date, Fukushima Prefecture, Japan. Its main festivals are held annually on April 22 and October 10. 

The shrine was founded in 1881, and enshrines the kami of Kitabatake Chikafusa, Kitabatake Akiie, Kitabatake Akinobu, and Kitabatake Morichika. It is one of the Fifteen Shrines of the Kenmu Restoration.

Access 
The shrine is 35 minutes from Fukushima Station or 16 minutes from the Abukuma Express Line's Hobara Station by car.

See also
Fifteen Shrines of the Kenmu Restoration

External links
Video of tsunami damage to shrine

Shinto shrines in Fukushima Prefecture
Date, Fukushima
1881 establishments in Japan

Beppyo shrines